Model Engineers' Workshop is a UK hobby magazine published by My Time Media that was spun off Model Engineer in 1990. The magazine focuses on metal working workshop tools and techniques, although in recent years it has given more space to modern technologies such as CAD/CAM and 3D printing.

References

External links
 Official website

1990 establishments in the United Kingdom
Hobby magazines published in the United Kingdom
Engineering magazines
Magazines established in 1990
Metalworking
Science and technology magazines published in the United Kingdom